Graptophyllum is a genus of plants in the family Acanthaceae.

List of species
Graptophyllum balansae - New Caledonia
Graptophyllum excelsum; scarlet fuchsia, prickly fuchsia 
Graptophyllum ilicifolium; Mount Blackwood holly, holly fuchsia , holly-leaved graptophyllum 
Graptophyllum macrostemon - New Caledonia
Graptophyllum ophioliticum - New Caledonia
Graptophyllum pictum; caricature plant
Graptophyllum reticulatum; reticulated holly, veiny graptophyllum 
Graptophyllum spinigerum 
Graptophyllum thorogoodii 

 
Acanthaceae genera
Flora of Pakistan